Avinash Sunil Sharma (born 15 September 1981 in Whangarei, New Zealand), made his first class debut for Oxford University cricket team in 2010, scoring 185 not out in the Varsity Match, the oldest first class fixture in cricket, dating back to 1827. He is the brother of former Oxford cricket captain Rajiv Sharma. Avinash Sharma holds the record for the highest ever score on first class debut in the Varsity match. This is also the highest ever score on debut by a New Zealander in a first class cricket match.

Sharma was a William Georgetti Scholar

References

External links
 
 

1981 births
Living people
New Zealand cricketers
Oxford University cricketers
Alumni of Green Templeton College, Oxford